Toby Knight is an English professional rugby union player, who currently plays as a back row forward for Premiership Rugby side Saracens.

Early life 
Knight grew up in Southend-on-Sea, Essex and attended Shoeburyness High School. He played youth rugby at Westcliff, later earning a scholarship to Berkhamsted School. This would eventually lead to his recruitment into the Saracens academy.

Club career 
After progressing through the junior ranks and into the Saracens senior academy, Knight made his initial first-team appearances in the pool stages of the 2021–22 Premiership Rugby Cup, before his Premiership debut followed away to Gloucester in June 2022, at the end of the 2021–22 regular season. In these matches, he was deployed both as a flanker and as a Number 8. Before the start of the 2022–23 season, Knight was promoted into the Saracens first-team squad on a full-time basis. During this season, he was also dual-registered with Ampthill in the RFU Championship.

International career 
Knight has represented England at age-group level, including a call-up to the England U18s when he was just 17. He was also part of the England U20s squad for the 2022 Six Nations and their subsequent summer series that year. During the U20s Six Nations, Knight captained England on several occasions, notably on his debut appearance against Scotland U20s, when he scored two tries on the way to a 41–24 victory.

References

2002 births
Living people
English rugby union players
Rugby union flankers
Saracens F.C. players
Sportspeople from Southend-on-Sea
People educated at Berkhamsted School
Ampthill RUFC players